Elena Shumilova (Russian: Елена Борисовна Шумилова; born 1 April 1978) is a Russian politician and a journalist who is currently the senator from the Legislative Assembly of the Republic of Karelia since 24 September 2020.

As of October 19, 2022,  Shumilova was under personal sanctions introduced by the European Union, the United Kingdom, the USA, Canada, Switzerland, Australia, Ukraine, New Zealand, for ratifying the decisions of the "Treaty of Friendship, Cooperation and Mutual Assistance between the Russian Federation and the Donetsk People's Republic and between the Russian Federation and the Luhansk People's Republic" and providing political and economic support for Russia's annexation of Ukrainian territories.

Biography

In 1998, Shumilova graduated from the Pedagogical College, named after Ivan Kuratov. In 2011, she also received a degree from the Komi State Pedagogical Institute. From 2000 to 2010, she worked as a journalist in the local republican media. In 2015, she was elected deputy of the Koygorodsky District council. The same year, she joined the All-Russia People's Front. On 13 September 2020, she became the Senator from the Komi Republic.

References

Living people
1978 births
United Russia politicians
21st-century Russian politicians
Members of the Federation Council of Russia (after 2000)